Shapa Gewog (Dzongkha: ཤར་པ་) is a gewog (village block) of Paro District, Bhutan. In 2002, the gewog had an area of 76.4 square kilometres and contained 8 chewogs and 253 households.

References

Gewogs of Bhutan
Paro District